Jiří Janošek is a Czech male track cyclist, representing Czech Republic at international competitions. He competed at the 2016 UEC European Track Championships in the team sprint event and 1km time trial event.

References

Living people
Czech male cyclists
Czech track cyclists
People from Hranice (Přerov District)
1997 births
Sportspeople from the Olomouc Region